Luke White may refer to:

Luke White (died 1824) (1740–1824), Irish MP for Leitrim
Luke White (of Rathcline) (a. 1789 – 1854), son of the above, Irish MP for County Longford
Luke White, 2nd Baron Annaly (1829–1888), Liberal MP for Clare 1859–1860, Longford 1861–1862
Luke White, 5th Baron Annaly (1927–1990), English peer and cricketer
Luke White, 6th Baron Annaly (born 1954), British Army officer and Conservative politician
Luke White (English politician) (1845–1920), Liberal MP for Buckrose 1900–1918
Luke Batt aka Luke White, son of Mike Batt and co-producer of Ketevan